Nandgaon in Mawal taluka of Pune district, Maharashtra, India, was listed as a village in the 2011 Census of India but was recorded as being uninhabited at that time, as it also was in 2001.

The village is administrated by a sarpanch, an elected representative who leads a gram panchayat. At the time of the 2011 census, the gram panchayat governed four villages and was based at Adhale Budruk.

See also 
List of villages in Mawal taluka

References 

Villages in Mawal taluka
Former villages